Amplification is used to describe a judged tendency of a person to amplify physical symptoms based on psychological factors such as anxiety or depression. Distinct interpretations of this type of  presentation could be sensory processing disorder involving differences in the way a person reacts to sensory input which is regarded as a pervasive developmental disorder related to the autism spectrum; or there is an alternative psychological concept of 'innate sensitiveness' as a personality trait coined by Carl Jung later developed into the highly sensitive person trait. In one instance where amplification is used as a handle or point of reference or diagnosis it is said "somatosensory amplification refers to the tendency to experience somatic sensation as intense, noxious, and disturbing. What may be a minor 'twinge' or mild 'soreness' to the stoic, is a severe, consuming pain to the amplifier."

Psychological state has been documented to affect the course of upper respiratory tract infection, post-infectious irritable bowel syndrome, and musculoskeletal pain.

Amplification is not recognized by the American Psychiatric Association.

The somatosensory amplification scale (SAS) has been validated to measure amplification. The scale contains four items measured with a  five-item Likert scale:
 Sudden loud noises really disturb me
 I'm very uncomfortable when I'm in a place that is too hot or too cold
 I can't stand pain as well as most people can
 I find I'm often aware of various things happening in my body
 I'm quick to sense the hunger contractions in my stomach

Amplification is related to alexithymia. Amplification may also contribute to multiple-drug intolerance (if the adverse effects that are reported are non-specific). It is unclear whether amplification is related to observations that Type A personality trait may be associated with delayed recovery after organic illness.

See also
 Alexithymia
 Somatisation

References

Somatic symptom disorders